Phenanthrene is a polycyclic aromatic hydrocarbon (PAH) with formula C14H10, consisting of three fused benzene rings. It is a colorless, crystal-like solid, but can also appear yellow. Phenanthrene is used to make dyes, plastics and pesticides, explosives and drugs. It has also been used to make bile acids, cholesterol and steroids.

Phenanthrene occurs naturally and also is a man-made chemical. Commonly, humans are exposed to phenanthrene through inhalation of cigarette smoke but there are many routes of exposure. Animal studies have shown that phenanthrene is a potential carcinogen. However, according to IARC, it is not identified as a probable, possible or confirmed human carcinogen.

Phenanthrene's three fused rings are angled as in the phenacenes, rather than straight as in the acenes. The compound with a phenanthrene skeleton and nitrogens at the 4 and 5 positions is known as phenanthroline.

Chemistry
Phenanthrene is nearly insoluble in water but is soluble in most low polarity organic solvents such as toluene, carbon tetrachloride, ether, chloroform, acetic acid and benzene.

The Bardhan–Sengupta phenanthrene synthesis is a classic way to make phenanthrenes.

This process involves electrophilic aromatic substitution using a tethered cyclohexanol group using diphosphorus pentoxide, which closes the central ring onto an existing aromatic ring. Dehydrogenation using selenium converts the other rings into aromatic ones as well. The aromatization of six-membered rings by selenium is not clearly understood, but it does produce H2Se.

Phenanthrene can also be obtained photochemically from certain diarylethenes.

Reactions of phenanthrene typically occur at the 9 and 10 positions, including:
 Organic oxidation to phenanthrenequinone with chromic acid
 Organic reduction to 9,10-dihydrophenanthrene with hydrogen gas and raney nickel
 Electrophilic halogenation to 9-bromophenanthrene with bromine
 Aromatic sulfonation to 2 and 3-phenanthrenesulfonic acids with sulfuric acid
 Ozonolysis to diphenylaldehyde

Canonical forms

Phenanthrene is more stable than its linear isomer anthracene. A classic and well established explanation is based on Clar's rule. A novel theory invokes so-called stabilizing hydrogen-hydrogen bonds between the C4 and C5 hydrogen atoms.

Natural occurrences 
Ravatite is a natural mineral consisting of phenanthrene. It is found in small amounts among a few coal burning sites. Ravatite represents a small group of organic minerals.

In plants

See also
 Chrysene

References

External links 
 Phenanthrene at scorecard.org

 
Polycyclic aromatic hydrocarbons